Alessandro Rigotti (born 20 April 1978) is an Italian voice actor. Alessandro contributes to dubbing characters in cartoons, anime, sitcoms, and more content.

He is well known for providing the voice of Sasuke Uchiha in the Italian-language versions of Naruto and Naruto: Shippuden. He also provided the voice of the character Mohinder Suresh in the Italian-language version of Heroes.

Voice work

Anime and animation
 Sasuke Uchiha in Naruto
 Sasuke Uchiha in Naruto: Shippuden
 Sasuke Uchiha in Naruto the Movie: Ninja Clash in the Land of Snow
 Chazz Princeton in Yu-Gi-Oh! GX
 Pierre Tempête de Neige in Sugar Sugar Rune
 Xandir in Drawn Together
 Kyosuke Takakura in Nana
 Lemaire in Blue Dragon
 Richard "Richie" Osgood Foley in Static Shock
 Daichi Fuwa and Ippei Toyama in Whistle!
 Mikey Simon in Kappa Mikey
 Zane in Lego Ninjago: Masters of Spinjitzu
 Reggie in Pokémon
 Zero in Pokémon: Giratina and the Sky Warrior
 Tony Star/Iron Man (First voice) in Iron Man: Armored Adventures
 Ukyo in Samurai 7
 Garline in Vampire Princess Miyu
 Rodney in The Life & Times of Tim
 Phantom in MÄR
 Ikuto Tsukiyomi in Shugo Chara!
 Joshua Christopher in Chrono Crusade
 Maximilien Robespierre in Le Chevalier D'Eon
 Juda in Legends of the Dark King
 Tim and Diego (Second voice) in Titeuf
 Tatsuhiro Satō in Welcome to the N.H.K.
 Hal Jordan/Green Lantern in Green Lantern: The Animated Series

Live action
 Mohinder Suresh in Heroes
 Rudy Wade in Misfits
 Owen Hunt in Grey's Anatomy
 Simon Brenner in ER
 Patrick Brewer in McLeod's Daughters
 Ashur in Spartacus (2010 TV series)
 Steven "Flash" Gordon in Flash Gordon (2007 TV series)
 Josh Nichols in Drake & Josh
 Christian Castellhoff in Alisa – Folge deinem Herzen
 Quinn Andrews in Everything You Want
 Antonio in Monster Warriors

Video games
Desmond Miles in Assassin's Creed
Desmond Miles in Assassin's Creed II
Desmond Miles in Assassin's Creed: Brotherhood
Desmond Miles in Assassin's Creed: Revelations
Leon S. Kennedy in Resident Evil: Operation Raccoon City
Leon S. Kennedy in Resident Evil 6
Ratchet in PlayStation All-Stars Battle Royale
Norman Jayden in Heavy Rain

References

External links
 

Living people
Actors from Turin
Italian male voice actors
1978 births